Ruta Lee (born Ruta Mary Kilmonis; May 30, 1935) is a Canadian-American actress and dancer who appeared as one of the brides in the musical Seven Brides for Seven Brothers. She had roles in films including Billy Wilder's crime drama Witness for the Prosecution and Stanley Donen's musical comedy Funny Face, and also is remembered for her guest appearance in a 1963 episode of Rod Serling's sci-fi series The Twilight Zone called "A Short Drink from a Certain Fountain". 

Lee guest-starred on many television series, and was also featured on a number of game shows, including Hollywood Squares, What's My Line?, and Match Game, and as Alex Trebek's co-host on High Rollers.

Early life
Ruta Lee was born on May 30, 1935, in Montreal, Quebec, the only child of Lithuanian Roman Catholic immigrants. Her father was a tailor and her mother a homemaker.

On March 1, 1948, her family moved to the United States and ended up settling in Los Angeles, where she graduated in 1952 from Hollywood High School and began studying acting and appearing in school plays. She attended both Los Angeles City College and the University of California at Los Angeles. She worked as a cashier, usherette, and candy girl at Grauman's Chinese Theater, but when she was $40 short in her cash account at the end of her shift one night, she was fired.

Career

Lee then got a break as a guest on two episodes of CBS's The George Burns and Gracie Allen Show. She soon found an agent, who landed her a job in an episode of The Roy Rogers Show, followed by a spot in 1953 on the series Adventures of Superman. That same year, while acting in a small theater production of On the Town, she landed a role as bride Ruth in the Academy Award-nominated musical Seven Brides for Seven Brothers, while still billed as Ruta Kilmonis. After that success, Lee appeared in several films, including Anything Goes (1956), Funny Face (1957), Witness for the Prosecution (1957), and Marjorie Morningstar (1958). In 1962, she played the female lead in the Rat Pack comedy/Western film Sergeants 3 starring Frank Sinatra, Dean Martin, Sammy Davis Jr., Peter Lawford, and Joey Bishop. She then co-starred with Audie Murphy and Darren McGavin in a Western, Bullet for a Badman (1964).

In addition to films, Lee has appeared in dozens of guest-starring roles on television. For a number of years, she seemed to be everywhere on the small screen. From 1957 to 1959, she was cast in different roles in eight episodes of the CBS crime drama series The Lineup, and also played the leading lady in three episodes of Maverick: "The Comstock Conspiracy" (1957) with James Garner, "The Plunder of Paradise" (1958), and "Betrayal" (1959) with Jack Kelly. In 1959 and 1960, she was cast in four episodes of John Bromfield's syndicated crime drama U.S. Marshal.

She appeared as Ellen Barton in the 1960 episode "Grant of Land" of the ABC Western series, The Rebel, starring Nick Adams. She also made five guest appearances on the CBS courtroom drama series Perry Mason between 1958 and 1965, including the roles of murderer Connie Cooper in "The Case of the Screaming Woman" (1958), defendant Millie Crest in "The Case of the Foot-Loose Doll" (1959), as Vita Culver in "The Case of the Prudent Prosecutor", Vivian Cosgrave in the episode "The Case of the Libelous Locket" (1963), and as Irene Prentice in "The Case of the Gambling Lady" (1965).

Lee was further cast on Richard Diamond, Private Detective, Alfred Hitchcock Presents, Mickey Spillane's Mike Hammer, Sugarfoot, M Squad, Gunsmoke, 77 Sunset Strip, The Alaskans, Colt .45, Wagon Train, Bat Masterson, Hawaiian Eye, Rawhide, The Wild Wild West, Ironside, The Fugitive, and three episodes of Hogan's Heroes. Lee appeared in two guest spots of The Andy Griffith Show, in 1962 and 1965.

Also in 1965, she was cast as a movie star named Gloria Morgan in the episode "Gomer Dates a Movie Star" on the sitcom Gomer Pyle, U.S.M.C.. In 1963, she was cast in CBS's The Twilight Zone in the episode "A Short Drink from a Certain Fountain" as a woman whose elderly husband undergoes a scientific experiment and then ages "backward".

Lee also began appearing regularly on game shows such as Hollywood Squares, You Don't Say, and Match Game. In the early 1970s, Lee continued to perform in both film and television roles on Love, American Style and The Mod Squad, and had a role in the film The Doomsday Machine (1972). By 1974, Lee had grown frustrated by an increasing lack of roles, and took a job co-hosting the daytime game show High Rollers. She remained with the show until 1976.

During the 1980s, she lent her voice to episodes of The Flintstone Comedy Show and The Smurfs, in addition to guest roles on CHiPs, Fantasy Island, The Love Boat, and Charles in Charge. Lee also performed extensively in the mid-1980s on stage, including the title character in the musical Peter Pan.

From 1988 to 1989, Lee played a recurring role on the CBS sitcom Coming of Age. In 1989, she played the role of Sally Powers in the television movie Sweet Bird of Youth with Elizabeth Taylor. In the 1990s, Lee continued to appear in episodic television, most notably on the sitcom Roseanne. Lee appeared as the girlfriend of Bev Harris (Estelle Parsons), whose character disclosed she was gay.

She played the wife of comedian Jerry Lewis in the British comedy-drama Funny Bones (1995), in which they play the parents of the Oliver Platt's character. In 2002, Lee was presented with one of the Golden Boot Awards for her work in Western television and cinema.

In 2006, Lee received a star on the Hollywood Walk of Fame for her contributions to the television industry. In 1995, a Golden Palm Star on the Palm Springs Walk of Stars was dedicated to Lee.

In February 2008, Lee appeared as Clairee in a production of Steel Magnolias with Sally Struthers at the Casa Mañana theatre in Fort Worth, Texas. In October 2010, Lee played the role of Miss Mona in The Best Little Whorehouse in Texas, also at the Casa Mañana Theatre.

Personal life
In 1976, Lee married Texas restaurant executive Webster B. "Webb" Lowe Jr. They divided their time between their homes in Hollywood, Palm Springs, Fort Worth, and Mexico. Webb died July 1, 2020.  They had no children. Lee describes her political views as "conservative" and she appeared at the 1972 Republican National Convention. On August 24, 2013, Lee was inducted into the National Lithuanian American Hall of Fame.

In February 2019, Lee had her Lithuanian citizenship restored.

Off-camera
In 1964, Lee called then-Soviet Premier Nikita Khrushchev, asking him to pardon her grandmother Ludvise Kamandulis, who had been in an internment camp in Siberia since World War II. The pardon was granted, and Lee's grandmother came to live with her in California in 1964. Kamandulis died two years later. Lee again rescued a relative from the former Soviet Union when she secured custody of her 18-year-old cousin, Maryte Kaseta, from Lithuania in 1987.
 
Lee has been involved with the charitable organization The Thalians for over 50 years. In addition to raising money and providing services for troubled youth and mental-health organizations, Lee, who is also the board chairman, co-produced the annual Ball of the Thalians with the late Debbie Reynolds throughout these five decades. In 2011, after 55 years of involvement with The Thalians, she stepped down and is now a member emerita.

Filmography

Filmography

Television

See also
 List of Canadian actors
 List of dancers
 List of people from Fort Worth, Texas
 List of people from Montreal
 List of people from Palm Springs, California
 List of University of California, Los Angeles people

References

External links
 
 
 
 
 
 Interview, September, 2015
 Interview with Ruta Lee at Classic Film & TV Cafe, 14 April 2019
 Glamour Girls of the Silver Screen

1935 births
Living people
20th-century American actresses
20th-century Canadian actresses
21st-century American actresses
21st-century Canadian actresses
Actresses from Los Angeles
Actresses from Montreal
Actresses from Palm Springs, California
Actresses from Texas
Catholics from California
Catholics from Texas
California Republicans
Texas Republicans
American female dancers
American female models
American film actresses
American people of Lithuanian descent
American stage actresses
American television actresses
American voice actresses
Canadian female dancers
Female models from Quebec
Canadian film actresses
Canadian people of Lithuanian descent
Canadian stage actresses
Canadian television actresses
Canadian voice actresses
Canadian Roman Catholics
Game show models
Hollywood High School alumni
Los Angeles City College alumni
People from Fort Worth, Texas
University of California, Los Angeles alumni
People with acquired American citizenship